Sri Lanka participated in the 2010 Summer Youth Olympics in Singapore. Sri Lanka qualified 7 athletes in 4 sports.

Athletics

Sri Lanka qualified 1 athlete in athletics.

Boys
Track and Road Events

Badminton

Sri Lanka qualified 2 athletes in badminton.

Boys

Girls

Swimming

Sri Lanka qualified 2 athletes in swimming.

Table tennis

Individual

Team

References

External links
Competitors List: Sri Lanka

2010 in Sri Lankan sport
Nations at the 2010 Summer Youth Olympics
Sri Lanka at the Youth Olympics